Elachista melanura is a species of moth in the family Elachistidae. This species is endemic to New Zealand. It is classified as "Data Deficient" by the Department of Conservation.

Taxonomy 
This species was originally described by Edward Meyrick in 1889 using a female specimen collected in Hamilton in January. Hudson discussed this species in his 1928 publication The Moths and Butterflies of New Zealand. The holotype is held at the Natural History Museum, London.

Description 
Meyrick described the species as follows:

Distribution 
This species is endemic to New Zealand. Other than its type locality, this species has also been collected in Titirangi in February 2000.

Habitat 
The type specimen was collected in heath-like scrub and swamp habitat. It has also been collected in gumland and pakihi (a type of wetland).

Conservation status 
This species has been classified as having the "Data Deficient" conservation status under the New Zealand Threat Classification System.

References

Moths described in 1889
melanura
Moths of New Zealand
Endemic fauna of New Zealand
Taxa named by Edward Meyrick
Endemic moths of New Zealand